The Sky's the Limit is the fifth and final album by The Dynamic Superiors released on the Venture label in 1980.  It was available in very limited quantities and is extremely hard to find.  This is the only recording with Tony Washington's replacement singer Tony Camillo.  The sessions would later be released on CD in 2003 by P-Vine Records.

Track listing

2003 CD Release
 Magic Wand
 Nobody's Perfect
 I Can Still Remember
 Walk Softly
 After the Song Is Over
 Spend the Night
 Hold Me
 Let's Spend the Night Together
 Sweet Sugar
 Love Me Love Me Not
 Lucky Kinda Guy
 Diggin' What You Doing
 Close to You

References

1980 albums
Dynamic Superiors albums